The 2022–23 Big Bash League season or BBL|12 was the twelfth season of the Big Bash League (BBL), the professional men's Twenty20 domestic cricket competition in Australia. The round-robin phase of the tournament ran from 13 December 2022 to 4 February 2023 with Perth Scorchers dominating the standings. Perth Scorchers won their fifth BBL title against the Brisbane Heat by 5 wickets.

Background
Perth Scorchers were the defending champions, having won their 4th title in the 2021–22 Big Bash League season. The season saw the implementation of the international draft system, and removal of the Bash Boost point and X-Factor from the tournament. The Decision Review System was also implemented for the first time, with each team having one review available per innings, retaining the review if successful.

Draft
The 2022–23 season saw the inaugural international draft for the Big Bash League. It was held on 29 August 2022.

Teams

Personnel and stadiums

Squads

Visa-contracted players 

Maximum of 3 visa-contracted players permitted in the matchday squad.

Venues
A total of seventeen venues have been selected to be used for the tournament, with North Sydney Oval No. 1, Lavington Sports Ground in Albury, and Cazalys Stadium in Cairns each hosting their first BBL match.

Pre-season

Regular season

League table

Summary of results
A summary of results for each team's fourteen regular season matches, plus finals where applicable, in chronological order. A team's opponent for any given match is listed above the margin of victory or defeat.

Matches
On 14 July 2022, Cricket Australia confirmed the full schedule for the tournament.

Week 1

Week 2

Week 3

Week 4

Week 5

Week 6

Week 7

Play-offs

Bracket

Matches

Season statistics

Team records 

Last updated: 4 February 2023

Batting records 

Last updated: 4 February 2023

Last updated: 4 February 2023

Last updated: 4 February 2023

Last updated: 4 February 2023

Last updated: 4 February 2023

Last updated: 4 February 2023

Last updated: 4 February 2023

Bowling records 

Last updated: 4 February 2023

Last updated: 4 February 2023

Last updated: 4 February 2023

Attendances

Notes

References

External links
 Official website
 League home at ESPN Cricinfo
 Big Bash League Schedule 2022-23

Big Bash League seasons
Big Bash League
Big Bash League